The Student Union at the Royal Institute of Technology (Tekniska Högskolans Studentkår or THS) is the students' union at the Royal Institute of Technology in Stockholm, Sweden. It is affiliated with the Stockholm Federation of Student Unions.

The student union was founded on 26 November 1901. The union building Nymble was designed  by leading Swedish modernists Uno Åhrén and Sven Markelius in 1928 and inaugurated in 1930; it is significant as one of the first examples of modernist architecture in Sweden and has status as a listed building.

The student union has a governing chamber of delegates elected by the students at the Institute and a board and other officials elected by the delegates. The union appoints student representatives to various boards of the Institute.

The members of THS are divided into chapters or "sections" of the union. Each chapter corresponds to a number of programs (bachelor, master or doctoral) at the Royal Institute of Technology. Each chapter has its own management and arranges a reception for new students. The chapters or sections of THS are:

See also 
Chalmers Students' Union

External links 
Tekniska Högskolans Studentkår - Official site

Royal Institute of Technology
KTH Royal Institute of Technology
Organizations based in Stockholm
Student organizations established in 1901
1901 establishments in Sweden
Buildings and structures completed in 1930
1930 establishments in Sweden
Listed buildings in Sweden